Chita-Kadala International Airport  is a single runway airport, located in Chita, the administrative center of Zabaykalsky Krai, Russia. The airport handles about 150,000 passengers per year.

Airlines and destinations

Statistics

Annual Traffic 
Annual Passenger Traffic

Busiest routes

References

External links
Chita Airport official site

Airports built in the Soviet Union
Airports in Zabaykalsky Krai
Novaport